Ramón Rodríguez (born December 20, 1979) is a Puerto Rican actor known for his current role as the title character in the ABC series Will Trent. Previous roles of interest included The Wire (2006–08) and Day Break (2006–07), and in the films Transformers: Revenge of the Fallen (2009) and The Taking of Pelham 123 (2009). He portrayed John Bosley in the 2011 reboot of Charlie's Angels. In 2014, Rodríguez starred as Ryan Lopez on the Fox crime drama television series Gang Related. In 2018, he played the role of Benjamin Cruz on the Showtime television series The Affair.

Life and career
Rodríguez was born in Puerto Rico and grew up on the Lower East Side of Manhattan. He attended New York City Lab School for Collaborative Studies and then The Leelanau School in Michigan, where he played basketball during his final two years. He continued playing basketball for another two years at Wheeling Jesuit University in West Virginia, before transferring to New York University, where he earned his degree in sports marketing.

Rodríguez began his career in 2005, with the role of Ángel Rodríguez in the direct-to-video film Carlito's Way: Rise to Power and the recurring role of Kevin Vasquez on two episodes of Rescue Me. He went on to appear on series such as Law & Order: Special Victims Unit, Day Break, and The Wire. He has also appeared in the films Bella (2006), Pride and Glory (2008), Surfer, Dude (2008), The Taking of Pelham 123 (2009), and Transformers: Revenge of the Fallen (2009). Rodríguez was cast as John Bosley for the television reboot of Charlie's Angels in 2011. The series was cancelled after four episodes had aired.

In 2013, he landed the lead role on the Fox crime drama series Gang Related, portraying Ryan Lopez, the adopted son of a crime lord who infiltrates the Los Angeles Police Department so his family can keep ahead of the law. The series began in 2014, but was ultimately cancelled after one season. Rodríguez then co-starred as Joe "Beasty" Peck, with Aaron Paul, in the action film Need for Speed. In 2016, Rodríguez co-starred opposite Vera Farmiga and Virginia Madsen in the adventure drama film Burn Your Maps, directed by Jordan Roberts. In 2017, he co-starred as Matt Morales in the drama biopic Megan Leavey, alongside Kate Mara, who played US Marine Megan Leavey. Also that year, he played the role of Bakuto in both the Netflix series Iron Fist and The Defenders.

Filmography

Film

Television

Video games

References

External links
 

1979 births
Living people
21st-century American male actors
American male film actors
American male television actors
Puerto Rican male actors
Hispanic and Latino American male actors
People from the Lower East Side
People from Río Piedras, Puerto Rico
New York University alumni
Wheeling University alumni